Bird Seed is the seventeenth album by power electronics group Whitehouse released in 2003 by their own record label, Susan Lawly. It was given an "honourable mention" in the digital musics category of Austria's annual Prix Ars Electronica awards. It was reissued on double vinyl through Very Friendly in July 2009. The title track was recorded by Steve Albini and written by Peter Sotos.

Track listing
All songs written by William Bennett, except for "Bird Seed", written by Peter Sotos

Personnel
William Bennett – vocals, synthesizer, computer, lyrics, graphic design, production
Philip Best – vocals, synthesizer
Peter Sotos – samples (on "Bird Seed")
Alan Gifford – graphic design
Denis Blackham – mastering

References

External links
 

2003 albums
Whitehouse (band) albums